Lesbian, gay, bisexual, and transgender (LGBT) rights in Myanmar are subject to official persecution and discrimination, with LGBT people facing legal and social challenges not experienced by others. Same-sex sexual activity is illegal and section 377 of Myanmar's Penal Code 1861 subjects same-sex sexual acts (regardless of whether they were consensual or done in private) to a term of imprisonment of up to 20 years in prison. Heterosexual anal intercourse and oral sex are also illegal. Transgender people are subject to police harassment and sexual assault, and their gender identity is not recognised by the state. During the country's long military dictatorship under the authoritarian State Peace and Development Council between 1988 and 2011, it was difficult to obtain accurate information about the legal or social status of LGBT Burmese citizens. Following the 2011–2015 Myanmar political reforms, improvements in media and civil freedoms have allowed LGBT people to gain more visibility and support in the country. Despite the 2015 electoral victory of the National League for Democracy, which promised improved human rights and whose leader Aung San Suu Kyi had once called for the decriminalisation of homosexuality, there have been no changes to anti-LGBT laws. Nevertheless, LGBT activists have noted a growing climate of societal acceptance and tolerance toward LGBT people, in line with worldwide trends.

Legality of same-sex sexual activity 
Section 377 of the Penal Code prohibits sodomy, whether heterosexual or homosexual. Alongside fines, the prescribed punishment is up to 20 years, although the law has not been strictly enforced. In 2001, an exile group, the All Burma Students' Democratic Front, voted to have the law repealed. This was seen as a victory by the Committee for Lesbigay Rights in Burma, although such a change was considered unlikely to occur given the prevailing political climate against change. In 2013, then-Opposition leader Aung San Suu Kyi called on the country to decriminalise homosexuality, stating that it was hampering efforts to combat HIV in Myanmar. After her party came to power in 2015, it did not change the laws.

LGBT people are also targeted under the "shadow law" or "darkness law" in section 35(c) of the Police Act, which allows police to detain anyone they consider behaving suspiciously after sunset. In November 2018, gay activist Aung Myo Htut, also knows as "Addy Chen" was arrested under the country's sodomy law.

Other provisions of the Penal Code can also be used against LGBT people:
 Sections 269 and 270 make it a crime for a person to negligently spread a sexually transmitted disease.
 Section 290 makes it a crime to commit "a public nuisance", not specified in the code, with fines up to two hundred rupees.
 Sections 292, 293, and 294 make it a crime to make, sell, or distribute "obscene" material or songs to adults or minors and to engage in any obscene acts in public.
 Section 372 prohibits buying or selling a prostitute under the age of eighteen or using a prostitute to engage in illicit sexual relations.
 Section 377 prohibits carnal intercourse with any man, woman, or animal and provides imprisonment varying between life and a term not less than 2 years, but may extend to 10 years and shall also be liable to a fine that shall not be less than four hundred rupees but may extend to one thousand rupees.
 Section 469 prohibits engaging in any marriage ceremony absent of a legal marriage.
 Section 5(j) of the Emergency Provisions Act ( ) prohibits anything that might affect the morality of an individual, society, or the public in a negative way.

Recognition of same-sex relationships 
Myanmar does not recognise same-sex marriages or civil unions. In 2014, a Burmese same-sex couple drew widespread media attention for holding an unofficial wedding ceremony after having lived together for 10 years. It also triggered a backlash from social conservatives, who queried why the anti-homosexuality laws were not being enforced against them.

Gender identity and expression
Myanmar does not allow transgender people to change the gender assigned to them at birth. Transgender people in Myanmar are subject to rape, mistreatment, or extortion by police, and are often targeted using the "shadow law" in section 35(c) of the Police Act. Generally, there are only three "respectable" career options open to transgender Burmese: beautician, fashion designer, or nat kadaw ("spirit wife" or spirit medium). As a nat kadaw, transgender Burmese people can be afforded respect and veneration otherwise denied to them by Burmese society.

Occult is a local term for the transgender community in Myanmar.

Living conditions

Public attitudes
During the military regime, no organised LGBT political or social life was able to exist. Burma's social mores about human sexuality have been described as being "extremely conservative". Gay men are stigmatised, especially if they are living with HIV/AIDS. In the local Buddhist tradition, those born LGBT are perceived as facing punishment for sins committed in a past life. Historically, the combination of official homophobia, limited public awareness, and lack of community role models have rendered LGBT people invisible in Burmese society.

LGBT activism
Aung Myo Min is an openly gay man and has been involved in the All Burma Students Democratic Front (ABSDF). In 2005, he talked about his coming out process and the homophobia that exists, even with the pro-democracy opposition. Today, he is involved with exile Burma human rights organisations, including the Campaign for Lesbigay Rights in Burma.

Equality Myanmar was founded in 2000 "with the goal of empowering the people of Myanmar through human rights education to engage in social transformation and promote a culture of human rights."

In late June 2019, a young gay man, Kyaw Zin Win, working as a librarian at the Myanmar Imperial University in Yangon, died by suicide after continuous harassment and bullying from colleagues. More than 600 people attended his funeral, and a rainbow flag was wrapped around his coffin. The university has launched an investigation into the matter and has suspended three staff members. The Myanmar National Human Rights Commission has launched a separate investigation and has called for the enactment of anti-discrimination provisions. PinkNews reported that the issue had "prompted a national conversation" on LGBT issues in the country.

Media
Despite their criminalisation, LGBT people have become more visible in Burma, especially after political reforms. Gay and lesbian couples freely cohabit in major cities like Yangon and Mandalay, though they are not legally allowed to marry. The increased media freedom has also allowed journalists to report on the gay and lesbian community. Same-sex couples have also been able to celebrate ceremonial marriages in major cities without any legal persecution.

In 2003, FocusAsia (Star TV) aired a story about the nat kadaws. The "Utopia Guide to Cambodia, Laos, Myanmar & Vietnam" references "transgender shaman channeling spirits at Myanmar sacred festivals."

In 2016, The Gemini was released and became the first LGBT film in the cinema of Myanmar. The film openly railed against the Burmese homosexuality laws.

Events
Burma celebrated its first gay pride in several cities around the country in 2012, to mark the International Day Against Homophobia, Biphobia and Transphobia. In 2018, officials gave permission for a public pride party. Almost 6,000 people showed up to the event, a rise from previous times. The number rose further to 10,000 the next day.

LGBT people
 Myo Ko Ko San - First Burmese transgender model, LGBT rights activist and beauty pageant queen.
 Shin Thant - Leading LGBT rights activist.
 Khin San Win - Burmese make-up artist and actress.
 Okkar Min Maung - Burmese actor, model and singer.
 Aung Myo Htut - also known as "Addy Chen", a gay activist who was arrested in November 2018 under the country's sodomy laws.
 Mogok Pauk Pauk - Burmese fashion designer.
 Myo Min Soe - Burmese fashion designer.
 John Lwin - former Burmese model, model agency founder, event organizer, and LGBT rights activist.
 Swe Zin Htet - Burmese model and beauty pageant titleholder.
Gae Gae - Burmese singer.

Summary table

See also
 Human rights in Myanmar
 LGBT rights in Asia

References

Further reading

 
Political movements in Myanmar
Burma
Human rights in Myanmar